The 2009 Challenger DCNS de Cherbourg was a professional tennis tournament played on indoor hard courts. It was part of the 2009 ATP Challenger Tour. It took place in Cherbourg-en-Cotentin, France between 2 and 8 March 2009.

Singles main-draw entrants

Seeds

Rankings are as of February 23, 2009.

Other entrants
The following players received wildcards into the singles main draw:
  Jonathan Eysseric
  Benoît Paire
  Stéphane Robert
  Guillaume Rufin

The following players received entry from the qualifying draw:
 Richard Bloomfield
 Jean-Christophe Faurel
 Romain Jouan
 Thomas Oger
 Eric Gomes (as a Lucky loser)
 Alex Kuznetsov (as a Lucky loser)

Champions

Men's singles

 Arnaud Clément def.  Thierry Ascione, 6–2, 6–4

Men's doubles

 Arnaud Clément /  Édouard Roger-Vasselin def.  Martin Fischer /  Martin Slanar, 4–6, 6–2, [10–3]

External links
 

Challenger DCNS de Cherbourg
Challenger La Manche
2009 in French tennis
March 2009 sports events in Europe